Remarks After the Hanging of John Brown was a speech given by Henry David Thoreau on December 2, 1859, the day of John Brown's execution. Thoreau gave a few brief remarks of his own, read poetry by Sir Walter Raleigh ("The Soul's Errand"), William Collins ("How Sleep the Brave"), Friedrich Schiller (excerpts from Samuel Taylor Coleridge's translation of "The Death of Wallenstein"), William Wordsworth (excerpts from "Alas! What boots the long laborious quest"), Alfred Tennyson (excerpts from "Maud"), George Chapman (excerpts from "Conspirary of Charles, Duke of Byron"), and Henry Wotton ("The Character of a Happy Life"), and then quoted from his own translation of Tacitus.

See also  
 The Last Days of John Brown
 A Plea for Captain John Brown

References

On-line sources 
 Remarks After the Hanging of John Brown at The Picket Line.

Printed sources 
 My Thoughts are Murder to the State by Henry David Thoreau
 The Higher Law: Thoreau on Civil Disobedience and Reform

1859 speeches
December 1859 events
Works by Henry David Thoreau
John Brown's raid on Harpers Ferry
Cultural depictions of John Brown (abolitionist)